Flotsam is goods from a sunken vessel that have floated to the surface of the sea, or any floating cargo that is cast overboard.

Flotsam may also refer to:

 Flotsam Moraines, moraines in Antarctica
 Flotsam (David Wiesner book), a children's book by David Wiesner
 Flotsam (novel), a 1939 novel by Erich Maria Remarque
 Flotsam (film), a 2015 Philippine romance film
 Flotsam (video game), a survival simulation video game
 Flotsam Island, a place in the Monkey Island series of graphical adventures

See also
 Flotsam and Jetsam (disambiguation)